The Our Lady of Wisdom or simply Cathedral of Butare, is a religious building belonging to the Catholic Church and is located in the town of Butare, in the southern part of the African country of Rwanda.

It is the largest cathedral in the nation, which was built in the 1930s when Butare (known as Astrida after 1935) was the colonial capital to commemorate the life of Astrid of Sweden Queen consort of the Belgians until 1935.

The cathedral follows the Roman or Latin rite and serves as the seat of the Diocese of Butare (Dioecesis Butarensis) which was erected in 1961 by Pope John XXIII by bula Gaudet sanctum.

See also
Roman Catholicism in Rwanda
Cathedral Basilica of Our Lady

References

Roman Catholic cathedrals in Rwanda
Buildings and structures in Butare
Roman Catholic churches completed in the 1930s
20th-century Roman Catholic church buildings in Rwanda